The Thorn Commission was the European Commission that held office from 6 January 1981 until 5 January 1985. Its President was Gaston Thorn.

Work
It was the successor to the Jenkins Commission and was succeeded by the Delors Commission. With a current economic crisis, it had to speed up enlargement to Greece, Spain and Portugal while making steps towards the Single European Act in 1985. However, with a period of eurosclerosis, due to economic problems and British vetoing over the Community budget, Thorn was unable to exert his influence to any significant extent.

Membership

Summary by political leanings
The colour of the row indicates the approximate political leaning of the office holder using the following scheme:

References

 
European Commissions